Regennas Candy Shop is a historic candy-making shop at 10 Maple lane in Myerstown, Pennsylvania. It was first established in Philadelphia in 1894 as C. Fred Regennas & Sons  at 1330 North 19th Street, and then, opened in Lititz in Lancaster County, Pennsylvania in 1910 before being moved to its current location. Regennas makes clear toy and other old-fashioned candy varieties.

Regennas Candy Shop uses 150 original clear toy molds. The clear toys are sold as individual pieces or on a stick, and are made in amber, red, and green colors. Special Christmas and Easter molds are used for seasonal clear toys.

References

Further reading
Vanishing crafts and their craftsmen Rollin C. Steinmetz, Charles Scott Rice Rutgers University Press, 1959  page 47

External links
Regennas website

Brand name confectionery
Confectionery companies of the United States
Companies based in Lebanon County, Pennsylvania
American companies established in 1894
1894 establishments in Pennsylvania